This list contains the names of individuals (of any ethnicity or nationality) who wrote poetry in the German language. Most are identified as "German poets", but some are not German.

A
Abraham a Sancta Clara
Friedrich Achleitner
Dietmar von Aist
Heinrich Albert (composer)
Der wilde Alexander
Hermann Allmers
Peter Paul Althaus
Günther Anders
Alfred Andersch
Ernst Moritz Arndt
Achim von Arnim
Bettina von Arnim
Hans Arp
H. C. Artmann
Hans Erasmus Aßmann
Hartmann von Aue
Count Anton Alexander von Auersperg
Rose Ausländer

B
Ingeborg Bachmann
Hugo Ball
Wolfgang Bauer
Konrad Bayer
Johannes Robert Becher
Richard Beer-Hofmann
Gottfried Benn
Michael Beheim
Werner Bergengruen
Thomas Bernhard
F.W. Bernstein
Marcel Beyer
Horst Bienek
Otto Julius Bierbaum
Wolf Biermann
Johannes Bobrowski
Paul Boldt
Wolfgang Borchert
Nicolas Born
Thomas Brasch
Volker Braun
Bertolt Brecht 
Helene Brehm
Clemens von Brentano
Theo Breuer
Rolf Dieter Brinkmann
Georg Britting
Hermann Broch
Barthold Heinrich Brockes
August Buchner
Georg Büchner
Gottfried August Bürger
Hermann Burger
Erika Burkart
Wilhelm Busch

C
Paul-Henri Campbell
Hans Carossa
Daniel Casper von Lohenstein
Paul Celan
Conrad Celtes
Adelbert von Chamisso
Hanns Cibulka
Matthias Claudius
Heinz Czechowski
Daniel Czepko von Reigersfeld

D
Simon Dach
Theodor Däubler
Georg Friedrich Daumer
Max Dauthendey
Franz Josef Degenhardt
Richard Dehmel
Friedrich Christian Delius
Franz von Dingelstedt
Hugo Dittberner
Reinhard Döhl
Tankred Dorst
Lebrecht Blücher Dreves
Annette von Droste-Hülshoff

E
Albert Ehrenstein
Günter Eich
Joseph von Eichendorff
Adolf Endler
Hans Magnus Enzensberger
Heinz Erhardt
Wolfram von Eschenbach

F
Gustav Falke
August Heinrich Hoffmann von Fallersleben
Fereydoun Farrokhzad
Jörg Fauser
Ernst, Baron von Feuchtersleben
Frank Findeiß
Johann Fischart
Cäsar Flaischlen
Paul Fleming
Walter Flex
Hans Folz
Theodor Fontane
Friedrich de la Motte Fouqué
Franzobel
Heinrich Frauenlob
Ferdinand Freiligrath
Erich Fried
Max Frisch
Gerhard Fritsch
Franz Fühmann
Louis Fürnberg

G
Emanuel Geibel
Christian Fürchtegott Gellert
Stefan George
Paul Gerhardt
Robert Gernhardt
Heinrich Wilhelm von Gerstenberg
Adolf Glassbrenner
Johann Wilhelm Ludwig Gleim
Leopold Friedrich Günther von Goeckingk
Albrecht Goes
Johann Wolfgang von Goethe
Johann Nikolaus Götz
Yvan Goll
Eugen Gomringer
Peter Gosse
Friedrich Wilhelm Gotter
Günter Grass
Fritz Grasshoff
Martin Greif
Franz Grillparzer
Hans Jakob Christoffel von Grimmelshausen
Klaus Groth
Durs Grünbein
Andreas Gryphius
Johann Christian Günther

H
Peter Hacks
Johannes Hadlaub
Friedrich von Hagedorn
Reinmar von Hagenau
Peter Handke
Georg Philipp Harsdörffer
Otto Erich Hartleben
Peter Härtling
Walter Hasenclever
Wilhelm Hauff
Gerhart Hauptmann
Friedrich von Hausen
Albrecht Haushofer
Christian Friedrich Hebbel
Johann Peter Hebel
Johann Heermann
Heinrich Heine
Hans-Jürgen Heise
Helmut Heißenbüttel
Karl Friedrich Henckell
Johann Gottfried Herder
Nikolaus Herman
Stephan Hermlin
Georg Herwegh
Hermann Hesse
Georg Heym
Paul Heyse
Wolfgang Hilbig
Jakob van Hoddis
Sophie Hoechstetter
Christian Hoffmann von Hoffmannswaldau
Michael Hofmann
Hugo von Hofmannsthal
Friedrich Hölderlin
Walter Höllerer
Ludwig Christoph Heinrich Hölty
Arno Holz
Peter Huchel
Richard Huelsenbeck
Norbert Hummelt
Christian Friedrich Hunold
Ulrich von Hutten

I
Karl Leberecht Immermann
Hans Irrigmann

J
Johann Georg Jacobi
Ernst Jandl
Elfriede Jelinek
Albrecht von Johansdorf
Ernst Jünger
Friedrich Georg Jünger

K
Georg Kaiser
Franz Xaver Kappus
Anna Louisa Karsch
Yaak Karsunke
Hermann Kasack
Abraham Gotthelf Kästner
Erich Kästner
Marie Luise Kaschnitz
Gottfried Keller
Hans Peter Keller
Justinus Kerner
Hermann Kesten
Gottfried Kinkel
Sarah Kirsch
Wulf Kirsten
Karin Kiwus
Klabund
Johann Klaj
Paul Klee
Paul Alfred Kleinert
Ewald Christian von Kleist
Heinrich von Kleist
Thomas Kling
Friedrich Gottlieb Klopstock
Christian Knorr von Rosenroth
Michael Kongehl
August Kopisch
Theodor Körner
Theodor Kramer
Karl Kraus
Helmut Krausser
Karl Krolow
Michael Krüger
James Krüss
Quirinus Kuhlmann
Günter Kunert
Reiner Kunze
Der von Kürenberg

L
Else Lasker-Schüler
Christine Lavant
Hans Leip
Anton G. Leitner
Nikolaus Lenau
Michael Lentz
Hermann Lenz
Jakob Michael Reinhold Lenz
Rudolf Leonhard
Gotthold Ephraim Lessing
Heinrich Leuthold
Thorsten Libotte
Alfred Lichtenstein
Magnus Gottfried Lichtwer
Ulrich von Liechtenstein
Detlev von Liliencron
Till Lindemann
Hermann Lingg
Angela Litschev
Otto Heinrich von Loeben
Friedrich von Logau
Hermann Löns
Iwar von Lücken
Martin Luther

M
Andreas Mand
Itzik Manger
Thomas Mann
Heinrich Mann
Uwe Martens
Kurt Marti
Friedrich von Matthisson
Georg Maurer
Karl May
Karl Mayer
Friederike Mayröcker
Christoph Meckel
Walter Mehring
Ernst Meister
Conrad Ferdinand Meyer
Johann Martin Miller
Alfred Mombert
Christian Morgenstern
Eduard Mörike
Heinrich von Morungen
Johann Michael Moscherosch
Erich Mühsam
Heiner Müller
Inge Müller
Wilhelm Müller
Börries Freiherr von Münchhausen

N
Joachim Neander
Johann Nestroy
Georg Neumark
Friedrich Nietzsche
Philipp Nicolai
Helga M. Novak
Novalis (Friedrich von Hardenberg)

O
Andreas Okopenko
Martin Opitz
Ernst Ortlepp

P
Bert Papenfuß
Oskar Pastior
Ludwig Pfau
Gottlieb Konrad Pfeffel
Heinz Piontek
August von Platen-Hallermünde
Johannes Plavius
Steffen Popp
Robert Prutz

R
Wilhelm Raabe
Ferdinand Raimund
Karl Wilhelm Ramler
Lutz Rathenow
Jacob Regnart
Robert Reinick
Neidhart von Reuental
Fritz Reuter
Karl Riha
Rainer Maria Rilke
Joachim Ringelnatz
Johann Rist
Eugen Roth
Ralf Rothmann
Friedrich Rückert
Gerhard Rühm
Peter Rühmkorf

S
Hans Sachs
Nelly Sachs
Alexios Schandermani (born 1953)
Johannes Scheffler, named Angelus Silesius
Friedrich Schiller
Sibylla Schwarz
Kurt Schwitters
Moriz Seeler
Lutz Seiler
Friedrich Leopold zu Stolberg-Stolberg
Moritz von Strachwitz
Gottfried von Strassburg
Botho Strauss
Der Stricker

T
Georg Thurmair
Maria Luise Thurmair
Ludwig Tieck
Georg Trakl
Hugo von Trimberg
Süßkind von Trimberg
Kurt Tucholsky
Ulrich von Türheim
Heinrich von dem Türlin

U
Ludwig Uhland
Anthony Ulrich, Duke of Brunswick-Wolfenbüttel

V
Hendrik van Veldeke
Walther von der Vogelweide
Johann Heinrich Voß

W
Robert Walser
Erich Weinert
Oswald von Wolkenstein
Konrad von Würzburg
Christa Wolf

Z
Ulrich von Zatzikhoven

See also 
 List of German-language philosophers
 List of German-language authors
 Poetry
 German literature
 List of German-language playwrights
 List of German journalists
 Liste deutschsprachiger Dichter

External links 
Projekt Gutenberg-DE: all authors
List of authors
German Poetry

German
Poets
Poets